Aerides emericii is a species of epiphytic orchid. It is endemic to the Andaman and Nicobar Islands in the Bay of Bengal (politically part of India though closer to Myanmar, Thailand and Sumatra).

References

emericii
Flora of the Andaman Islands
Flora of the Nicobar Islands
Epiphytic orchids
Plants described in 1882